Pope Zachary (679 – March 752) was the bishop of Rome from 28 November 741 to his death. He was the last pope of the Byzantine Papacy. Zachary built the original church of Santa Maria sopra Minerva, forbade the traffic of slaves in Rome, negotiated peace with the Lombards, and sanctioned Pepin the Short's usurpation of the Frankish throne from Childeric III. Zachary is regarded as a capable administrator and a skillful and subtle diplomat in a dangerous time.

Early career
Zachary was born into a family of Greek origin, in the Calabrian town of Santa Severina. He was most probably a deacon of the Roman Church and as such signed the decrees of the Roman council of 732. He was selected to succeed Gregory III as pope on 3 December or 5 December 741.

Pontificate
Gregory III's alliance with the Lombard Duchy of Spoleto put papal cities at risk when the dukes of Spoleto and Benevento rebelled. Zachary turned to King Liutprand the Lombard directly. Out of respect for Zachary the king restored to the church of Rome all the territory seized by the Lombards and sent back the captives without ransom. The contemporary history (Liber pontificalis) dwells chiefly on Zachary's personal influence with Liutprand, and with his successor Ratchis. At the request of the Exarchate of Ravenna, Zachary persuaded Liutprand to abandon a planned attack on Ravenna and to restore territory seized from the city.

Zachary corresponded with Archbishop Boniface of Mainz, counseling him about dealing with disreputable prelates such as Milo, bishop of Reims and Trier. "As for Milo and his like, who are doing great injury to the church of God, preach in season and out of season, according to the word of the Apostle, that they cease from their evil ways." At Boniface's request, Zachary confirmed three newly established bishoprics of Würzburg, Büraburg, and Erfurt. In 742 he appointed Boniface as papal legate to the Concilium Germanicum, hosted by Carloman, one of the Frankish mayors of the Palace. In a later letter Zachary confirmed the metropolitans appointed by Boniface to Rouen, Reims, and Sens. In 745 Zachary convened a synod in Rome to discourage a tendency toward the worship of angels.

Zachary corresponded with temporal rulers as well. Answering a question from the Frankish Mayor of the Palace Pepin the Short, who planned to usurp the Frankish throne from the puppet-king Childeric III, Zachary rendered the opinion that it was better that he should be king who had the royal power than he who had not. Shortly thereafter, the Frankish nobles decided to abandon Childeric, the last Merovingian king, in favor of Pepin. Zachary remonstrated with the Byzantine emperor Constantine V Copronymus on his iconoclastic policies.

Zachary built the original church of Santa Maria sopra Minerva over an ancient temple to Minerva near the Pantheon. He also restored the decaying Lateran Palace, moving the relic of the head of Saint George to the church of San Giorgio al Velabro. After Venetian merchants bought many slaves in Rome to sell to the Muslims of Africa, Zachary forbade such traffic and then paid the merchants their price, giving the slaves their freedom.

Death and legacy

Pope Zachary died around 15 March 752 (it may also have been the 12th or 14th) and was buried in St. Peter's Basilica. His elected successor, Stephen, died within days, and Zachary was finally succeeded by Stephen II. The letters and decrees of Zachary are published in Jacques Paul Migne, Patrolog. lat. lxxxix. p. 917–960.

Church historian Johann Peter Kirsch said of Zachary: "In a troubled era Zachary proved himself to be an excellent, capable, vigorous, and charitable successor of Peter." Peter Partner called Zachary a skilled diplomat, "perhaps the most subtle and able of all the Roman pontiffs, in this dark corridor in which the Roman See hovered just inside the doors of the Byzantine world."

References

Further reading

Delogu, Paolo (2000). "Zaccaria, santo",  Enciclopedia dei papi Treccani. 
Duchesne, Louis, [https://archive.org/details/duchesne01 Le Liber Pontificalis]: texte, introduction et commentaire par L. Duchesne Tome I (Paris: E. Thorin 1886), pp. 426–439. (in Latin)

679 births
752 deaths
People from the Province of Crotone
Byzantine saints
Medieval Italian saints
Popes of the Byzantine Papacy
Greek popes
8th-century archbishops
Popes
Papal saints
8th-century Christian saints
8th-century popes
Burials at St. Peter's Basilica